"Bajo el mismo Cielo" ("Under the same sky") is a Latin pop song written and perform by Kany García. The song was chosen as the theme song for the HBO Latino original series Capadocia. A clip of the song is played at the beginning of every episode of the series. The song has received positive feedback by both fans and critics. The song will be include in the Special Edition of Kany's debut album, Cualquier Dia.

Music video
The music video was created with different scenes from the show including the cast. In some clips, it shows Kany performing the song with her band, also shows clips of Kany singing sitting on a sofa.

Release
The song "Bajo el Mismo Cielo" was released as digital download in Latin America. The song was also part of the TV soundtrack of Capadocia. The album is called Capadocia, Un lugar sin Perdon.

References

External links

Kany García songs
2007 songs
Songs written by Kany García